Antenne NRW is a private radio station based in Düsseldorf, North Rhine-Westphalia. It is a 100 percent subsidiary of Antenne Bayern GmbH & Co. KG from Ismaning. The programme is aimed at the core target group of 30- to 59-year-olds.

Programming
Since 29 October 2021, Antenne NRW has been broadcasting a full programme consisting of the elements of music, information, entertainment and service.

That with the slogan The best hits of all time! Advertised music format includes pop music of the past decades with a focus on the 1980s and 1990s. On the hour, news, weather forecast and traffic service for North Rhine-Westphalia can be heard.

The team from the very beginning includes Olivia Powell, Henri Sarafov, Jens Weber, Jörn Ehlert, Katharina Kuntic and Stefan Haase. While Powell, Sarafov and Weber act as presenters, Haase, Ehlert and Kuntic report as NRW reporters from all over the state.

Since 2 November 2021, the morning show Guten Morgen NRW has been running during the week, initially presented by Jörn Ehlert before Christian vom Hofe took over from January 2022.

Reception facilities 
Since 29 October 2021, Antenne NRW has been distributed via DAB+ in the state-wide digital radio multiplex of audio.digital NRW GmbH on channel 9D (208.064 MHz) and as a web stream.

References

External links 
 Official website of Antenne NRW
 Web radio

Companies based in Düsseldorf
Radio stations established in 2021